Lay off may refer to:

 Layoff, the temporary suspension of workers from work
 Lay off (cards), to add cards to an existing meld in games like rummy